Edson Cordeiro (born February 9, 1967) is a Brazilian sopranist countertenor and pop and jazz singer.

Life and career

Cordeiro was born in Santo André, São Paulo, Brazil. He began singing at 6 years old when he joined a church choir called "Cordeirinhos do Senhor". He became famous as a street singer. He had his first TV performance with his own version of the aria of the "Queen of the Night" (W. A. Mozart). In 1996, he won the Prêmio Sharp for the best Brazilian pop singer.

Cordeiro first toured Europe in 1995. He was greatly acclaimed after his concerts, especially in Germany, where he also performed on national TV. His repertoire ranges from opera and lieder to traditional Brazilian folksongs to 1970s disco music. It includes covers of Nina Hagen, Janis Joplin, Grace Jones, Prince and Édith Piaf, along with medieval psalms. As a vocalist, Cordeiro is comparable to Peruvian singer Yma Sumac, who in her prime also had a four-octave range. Cordeiro covered one of Sumac's songs, "Babalú". Cordeiro performs mainly in South America, with a recent brief stint in Germany.

He has lived in Germany for over a decade due, he says, to the homophobic harassment he suffered in Brazil. He is married to German writer Oliver Bieber.

Discography
 1991 Edson Cordeiro
 1994 Edson Cordeiro 2
 1996 Terceiro Sinal
 1998 Clubbing
 1998 Disco Clubbing Ao Vivo
 1999 Disco Clubbing 2 – Mestre de Cerimônia
 2001 Dê-se ao Luxo
 2005 Contratenor
 2007 Klazz Meets the Voice, Klazz Brothers & Edson Cordeiro (Released only in Europe)
 2008 The Woman's Voice (A Homage To Great Female Singers) (Released only in Europe)
 2015 Paradiesvogel
 2017 Fado

References

External links

edsoncordeiro.com.br, official homepage 
page on MySpace

1967 births
Brazilian opera singers
Countertenors
Gay singers
Brazilian gay musicians
Brazilian LGBT singers
Living people
People from Santo André, São Paulo
20th-century Brazilian LGBT people
21st-century Brazilian LGBT people
LGBT people in Latin music